Mountain geebung may refer to several species of flowering plants in the genus Persoonia, occurring in Australia:

Persoonia asperula, from New South Wales and Victoria
Persoonia chamaepitys, from New South Wales
Persoonia gunnii, from Tasmania